The Amherst College Glee Club, founded in 1865, is an SATB vocal ensemble, and one of the oldest continuous student organizations at Amherst College. It is part of the Amherst College Choral Society, along with the Concert Choir, and the Madrigal Singers. Previous a Tenor/Bass ensemble, in 2022 it came to encompass all voices in the Choral Society, merging with the Chorus. The club has a history of extensive international touring, having to date performed in over 55 countries. It is currently directed by Dr. Arianne Abela.

History

Founding

The club was founded as a student-directed double quartet in the spring semester of 1865 by Amherst senior Thomas E. Babb, in the spirit of Amherst's recently dissolved Donizetti Glee Club, founded in 1862.  Though the group nearly disbanded two years later when all but one of its members graduated, it was revived in 1868 after one lone year of inactivity.  It continued to flirt with dissolution — some years being quite active and successful and others less so — until the fall of 1876 when it came under the professional direction and training of "Professor" Friedrich Zuchtmann, a vocal instructor from Springfield, Massachusetts. Under his leadership the club found more firm footing and soon became a permanent fixture of Amherst College life.

Early accomplishments
In 1894 the Amherst Glee Club became one of the first American collegiate groups to travel to England.  In 1925 they sang at the White House for President Coolidge, and they twice won the New England Intercollegiate Glee Club Contest - once in 1928 and once in 1934.

Coming to maturity
In 1963 the club came under the direction of Bruce G. McInnes, former director of the Apollo Glee Club at Yale University.  Under this new leadership, Glee Club membership rose from under 30 in 1962 to over 100 in 1965.  In 1967 the club embarked on the first of several "World Tours".  These tours, each lasting over a month, eventually took the Glee Club all over the globe and featured a number of notable performances.  They became the first American chorus to sing High Mass at the Notre Dame Cathedral,  and sang for many notable people, including Pope Paul VI, King Mihendra and Queen Ratna of Nepal, president Jomo Kenyatta of Kenya, President Félix Houphouët-Boigny of the Ivory Coast, Princess Sarvath El Hassan of Jordan Prime Minister Menachem Begin of Israel, and noted composition teacher Nadia Boulanger.

Present
The club continues to perform both locally and internationally. In their 2007 tour to Estonia they sang for Prime Minister Andrus Ansip and President Toomas Hendrik Ilves. In 2022, all members of the Choral Society were made members of the Glee Club, and the Soprano/Alto Chorus was disbanded.

International tours 
1894 - England
1928 - Bermuda
1961 - France, Italy, Spain, Switzerland
1967 - "World Tour" - France, Italy, Greece, Austria, Germany, Czechoslovakia, USSR, Sweden, Denmark
1969 - "World Tour" - Japan, Korea, Taiwan, Thailand, Nepal, Iran, Lebanon, Greece, Yugoslavia, Austria, Czechoslovakia, France
1972 - "African-Asian Tour" - Liberia, Ivory Coast, Malawi, Zambia, Kenya, Saudi Arabia, Pakistan, Afghanistan, Iran, Lebanon, England
1975 - "World Tour" - Morocco, Algeria, Tunisia, Egypt, Jordan, Syria, Romania, Austria, France
1977 - "Latin American Tour" - Guatemala, Costa Rica, Colombia, Peru, Bolivia, Paraguay, Uruguay, Brazil, Suriname, Guyana, Trinidad
1979 - "International Tour" - Spain, Monaco, Tunisia, Syria, Jordan, Israel, Turkey, Austria, Poland, France
1983 - "World Tour" - United States, Japan, Korea, Taiwan, India, Austria, Italy, Monaco, France
1990 - USSR, Czechoslovakia
1995 - Poland, Czech Republic
1999 - Austria, Italy
2003 - Japan
2007 - Iceland, Estonia
2011 - Greece
2015 - Costa Rica
2019 - "Baltic Tour" - Estonia, Latvia, Lithuania

Notable alumni 
Albert II, Prince of Monaco
Dan Brown, author
Gregory W. Brown, composer
John Coolidge, son of U.S. President Calvin Coolidge
Philip Gossett, noted musicologist
Caleb R. Layton, U.S. Representative for Delaware
George Adams Leland, doctor and educator
Edmund Phelps, awarded the 2006 Nobel Prize in Economics
Calvin Coolidge, U.S. President
David Eisenhower, grandson of U.S. President Dwight Eisenhower
David Foster Wallace, American novelist, widely known for his 1996 novel Infinite Jest

Directors
1865-1876 - Student directed
1872-1874 - Assisted by George Cheney
1876-1883 - Friedrich Zuchtmann
1883-1894 - Alternated between students and Edward L. Sumner
1894-1911 - Student directed (likely assisted by music professor William P. Bigelow '89)
1912-1931 - Charles W. Cobb ‘97
1932      - John J. Bishop
1932-1946 - Ralph H. Oatley ‘22
1946-1948 - Temporary hiatus for World War II
1948-1950 - Henry G. Mishkin
1951-1953 - Robert K. Beckwith
1954-1958 - Charles W. Ludington
1958-1962 - James Heywood Alexander
1963 (spring)     - Charles M. Fassett
1963 (fall) - Bruce Archibald
1963-1985 - Bruce McInnes
1985-1986 - Mallorie Chernin and William McCorkle
1986–2018 - Mallorie Chernin
2018 (spring) - Gregory W. Brown
2018–Present - Arianne Abela

References

External links 
 Glee Club website maintained by Amherst College
 Student maintained Glee Club website

Glee clubs
Glee Club
Musical groups established in 1865
1865 establishments in Massachusetts